Simon Roger Egerton (born 9 January 1985) is an English field hockey player.

Egerton was born in Bury, England.  He was a member of the England Indoor and Outdoor squad from 2008–2013.

The Midfield / Forward scored on both his indoor and outdoor debuts against Scotland (Paisley) and Germany (Nuremberg) respectively.

Egerton played at HC Rotterdam and played until 2015 at Bowdon Hockey Club having previously played for Beeston Hockey Club and in 2013 HGC in the Dutch Hoofdklasse League. At HGC he finished second top goalscorer with 25 goals. Egerton was part of the Beeston Hockey Team which won the England Premier Division 2012/13, finishing top goalscorer in the competition.

Egerton had two spells in the New Zealand National Hockey League, winning the competition on both occasions. Central Districts in 2011 and Auckland 2013. Before that Egerton played for Blau Weiss Berlin, he was the top goalscorer in the competition with 28 goals, helping them secure Bundesliga 1. status.

References

External links

1985 births
Living people
Male field hockey forwards
English male field hockey players
Men's Hoofdklasse Hockey players
Men's England Hockey League players
HC Rotterdam players
Beeston Hockey Club players
HGC players